Ashlyn Krueger (born 7 May 2004) is an American tennis player. Krueger has a career-high singles ranking by the WTA of No. 154 achieved on March 6, 2023 and a career-high doubles ranking of world No. 138, achieved on 13 February 2023.

Junior Career
In 2020, Krueger won the Orange Bowl junior tournament as a wildcard.

Professional career
Krueger made her WTA Tour main draw debut at the 2021 Silicon Valley Classic, where she received a wildcard into the doubles tournament, partnering Robin Montgomery. She also received a wildcard on her Grand Slam debut at the 2021 US Open.

She qualified for the main draw at the 2022 US Open.

She also qualified for the WTA 1000 in 2022 and 2023 in Indian Wells.

Performance timeline
Only main-draw results in WTA Tour, Grand Slam tournaments, Fed Cup/Billie Jean King Cup and Olympic Games are included in win–loss records.

Singles
Current after the 2023 Indian Wells Open.

Doubles

WTA Challenger finals

Doubles: 1 (runner-up)

ITF Circuit finals

Singles: 2 (1 title, 1 runner-up)

Doubles: 5 (2 titles, 3 runner-ups)

Junior Grand Slam titles

Doubles: 1 (title)

Notes

References

External links
 
 

2004 births
Living people
American female tennis players
US Open (tennis) junior champions
Grand Slam (tennis) champions in girls' doubles
21st-century American women